Topolina  is a village in the administrative district of Gmina Wieliszew, within Legionowo County, Masovian Voivodeship, in east-central Poland.

It is named after the poplar tree (topola in Polish) of which there are a great many in the area.

References

Topolina